Jaws of Justice is a 1933 American Western film directed by Spencer Gordon Bennet and written by Joseph Anthony Roach. The film stars Jack Perrin, Robert Walker, Ruth Sullivan, Lafe McKee, Lightnin' Teddy, Gene Toler and Kazan the Wonder Dog. The film was released on December 4, 1933, by Principal Distributing.

Cast          
Jack Perrin as Sergeant Kinkaid 
Robert Walker as Boone Jackson
Ruth Sullivan as Judy Dean
Lafe McKee as 'Seeker' Dean
Lightnin' Teddy as Just a Pal 
Gene Toler as 'Kickabout' Riley 
Kazan the Wonder Dog as Kazan

References

External links
 

1933 films
1930s English-language films
American Western (genre) films
1933 Western (genre) films
Films directed by Spencer Gordon Bennet
American black-and-white films
1930s American films